The 2009 BH Tennis Open International Cup was a professional tennis tournament played on Hard courts. This was the eighteenth edition of the tournament which is part of the 2009 ATP Challenger Tour. It took place in Belo Horizonte, Brazil between 27 July and 2 August 2009.

Singles main draw entrants

Seeds

 Rankings are as of July 20, 2009.

Other entrants
The following players received wildcards into the singles main draw:
  Gabriel Dias
  Gregg Hill
  José Pereira
  Márcio Torres

The following players received entry from the qualifying draw:
  Guillermo Alcaide (as a Lucky Loser)
  John Paul Fruttero
  Rodrigo Guidolin
  Daniel King-Turner
  Iván Miranda

Champions

Singles

 Júlio Silva def.  Eduardo Schwank, 4–6, 6–3, 6–4

Doubles

 Márcio Torres /  Izak van der Merwe def.  Juan-Pablo Amado /  Eduardo Schwank, walkover

External links
Official website
ITF Search 
2009 Draws

BH Tennis Open International Cup
BH Tennis Open International Cup